Kelly Duda (born June 6, 1966 in Little Rock) is an American filmmaker and activist from Arkansas. Duda spent seven years making Factor 8: The Arkansas Prison Blood Scandal.

Factor 8

Variety magazine described Duda as "a pit bull with a bureaucratic bone" who "follows subjects fearlessly and ventures into hostile environs (and) comes away, most of the time, with the information he wants to get." Variety described Factor 8 as "hard-headed journalism" stating, "one of the things that hits the viewer in 'Factor 8' is that Ken Starr spent more than $40 million trying to pin something on then-President Bill Clinton, and missed what Duda found via sheer leg work." Duda experienced a significant amount of blow back in his native state of Arkansas as a result of his investigation, including claims of death threats, his tires being slashed, break-ins, files being stolen, and other things. The premiere of the film was delayed due to a legal dispute about the film's ownership.

The American Film Institute remarked, "Kelly Duda's dedication to the truth is an inspiration—this exposé wears his heart on its sleeve, refusing to let the victims die in vain."

Duda was also part of the team for Fuji Television that produced The Hepatitis C Epidemic: A 15-Year Government Cover-up. The program won a George Foster Peabody Award in 2003 and was reportedly watched by more than 12 million viewers in Japan.

Evidence and documents unearthed by Duda were used to help 5,500 "forgotten" Canadian victims of tainted blood receive a $1 billion compensation package from the Canadian federal government in 2006.

On July 11, 2007, Duda testified (as the only American) at the Lord Archer Inquiry on Contaminated Blood in the Parliament of the United Kingdom overseen by Peter Archer, Baron Archer of Sandwell. The British inquiry aimed to uncover the British government's part in a scandal that led to thousands of infections and deaths. Duda gave evidence as to the United States' role in the tragedy in what Lord Robert Winston has dubbed as "the worst treatment disaster in the history of the National Health Service". Describing him as "a bit of a maverick", the New Statesman remarked about Duda that, "his flat American accent stood out at the inquiry but not as much as his character," adding, "By the time he was done testifying to Lord Archer of Sandwell’s Inquiry, those in the audience who weren't familiar with his work had been swayed that the scandal was even worse than they realized - an idea that seemed impossible only one hour earlier."

In 2009, the two-year-old inquiry's conclusion condemned the UK government for its lack of self-sufficiency, citing the use of high-risk prisoners' blood from the U.S. as one of the factors.

Further evidence of Duda's helped lead to four successful class-action lawsuits for tainted blood victims in Japan, which led to government compensation for 1,000 victims, and an apology from Prime Minister Yasuo Fukuda, who on January 11, 2008, said: "We must frankly admit the state's responsibility for causing huge harm to the victims and for failing to prevent the harm from spreading. I express my apologies from my heart."

On December 4, 2017, Duda testified in a criminal trial in Naples, Italy against Duilio Poggiolini, and 10 representatives of the Marcucci Group, who have been charged with manslaughter. The Marcucci Group and its derivative companies supplied blood products (including factor 8) to Italian patients, including hemophiliacs. 2,605 Italians have been infected with HIV and hepatitis from contaminated blood products. According to media reports, the night before his court appearance, Duda had his phone stolen in Naples under suspicious circumstances, and then in a shocking move, the next day, prosecutor Lucio Giugliano sided with the Marcucci Group defense lawyers, in asking the court to block Duda from giving evidence and testifying. Lawyers Stefano Bertone and Ermanno Zancla, both on the same prosecution team as Giugliano, successfully argued against this request.

After testifying for more than four hours, Duda was able to link tainted blood collected from Arkansas prisoners to blood products manufactured by AIMA Plasmaderivati, the processing plant for Marcucci, and used by Italian patients who subsequently became infected with hepatitis C and HIV. Some of the Arkansas blood exported to Italy was the subject of two failed international recalls by the FDA. (Spain, Canada, Japan and Florida in the U.S. were other recipients of these failed recall blood.) At the end of the proceeding, words were exchanged between Duda and Giugliano, resulting in the prosecutor calling the police and carabinieri, who detained Duda and seized his passport. The prosecutor then unsuccessfully tried to bring charges against Duda and have him jailed. Lawyers Bertone and Zancla later asked that the prosecutor be sanctioned. The ill Fatto Quotidiano newspaper noted in its coverage of the proceeding that the Marcucci family has deep political ties to the Italian federal government with Senator Andrea Marcucci being close friends with former health minister Franco De Lorenzo and was once considered the right-hand man to former Prime Minister Matteo Renzi.

Other projects

In addition, Duda was the "go-to" contact in Arkansas for Robert Greenwald's controversial documentary Wal-Mart: The High Cost of Low Price, and has contributed to The ACLU Freedom Files.

On September 20, 2007, Kelly Duda traveled to Jena, Louisiana with students from the University of Central Arkansas to participate in the Jena 6 march for justice, along with Martin Luther King III and thousands of others.

Kelly Duda was co-founder, along with Lanette Grate, of the short-lived West Memphis Three Innocence Project, a 501(c)(3) organization, which was soon renamed to the West Memphis Three Injustice Project after being issue a cease and desist order for unauthorized and illegal use of the Innocence Project's name.  Duda was also the president of the board.  The board members included Grate, Mara Leveritt, Amanda Lamb, and Dennis Devine. Mara Leveritt has reported extensively about the WM3 for the Arkansas Times as well as authored a book on the subject called Devil's Knot: The True Story of the West Memphis Three, which was also the basis for a major motion picture of the same name. The mission of the West Memphis Three Injustice Project was to help exonerate Arkansas prisoners Jason Baldwin, Jessie Misskelley and Damien Echols, otherwise known as West Memphis Three. A long-time supporter of the cause to free the West Memphis 3, Duda joined the WM3 advocacy group Arkansas Take Action in 2007.  However, he soon became concerned about financial opacity and irregularities associated with the Damien Echols Trust Account, which appeared  to be getting all the funds raised by Echol's wife, Lorri Davis and WM3.org.  These concerns were shared by Dan Stidham, Jessie Misskelley's  original attorney, now a judge, and confirmed by Jason Baldwin's attorney, John T. Philipsborn. The WM3IP demanded transparency and accountability in WM3.org's fundraising process so that all three wrongly convicted men could benefit from financial donations, not just one. In fact, according to WM3IP's website at the time, very little of the donated funds collected by Lorri Davis via the WM3.org website had made its way to the defense teams for Misskelley and Baldwin, the "forgotten" other two members of the WM3. Stidham called this lack of fairness in the defense fund distribution "an injustice inside an injustice." Public backlash from WM3.org along with rejections from Damien Echols, Jessie Misskelley and Jason Baldwin of the WM3IP's accusations and donation offers led to heated forum-blog  exchanges and hurt feelings all around. Tactful concessions were eventually made with guarantees by Davis & Echol's attorney, Dennis Riordan.  As a direct result of the WM3IP's efforts and demands, reforms took place and the organization disbanded in 2008, cutting short their original stated mission of raising money for other unjustly incarcerated prisoners within the Arkansas prison system. In 2011 after the release of the West Memphis Three via the Alford plea, it was revealed that Peter Jackson had been anonymously supporting Damien Echols defense, covering the cost of DNA testing and private investigators.

Kelly Duda was a judge at the Little Rock Film Festival and Hot Springs Documentary Film Festival.

In 2012, Kelly accompanied actor and civil rights activist George Takei on a pilgrimage to the Rohwer War Relocation Center site and cemetery, marking the 70th anniversary of Executive Order 9066 signed by President Franklin D. Roosevelt. Takei and his family were Japanese Americans interned at Rohwer during World War II. He was also a photographer on the 2014 documentary To Be Takei.

Robert E. Lee Day campaign

In 2015, five months before the Charleston church shooting in South Carolina, Duda spearheaded an effort to abolish Robert E. Lee Day as a state holiday in Arkansas, currently celebrated on Martin Luther King Jr. Day, the national holiday, by lobbying lawmakers and speaking to the media. "I think having Lee day on MLK day is just a jeer to the memory of the man who fought for equality," Duda told lawmakers. After two separate bills were drafted to end the confederate holiday, the proposed law failed four times to make it out of the Republican controlled committee.  Arkansas is one of only three states (along with Alabama and Mississippi) that celebrates a Lee-King holiday.

A year later, Gov. Asa Hutchinson, a Republican, called on lawmakers to pass legislation that gives King a day of his own when they meet for a regular session in 2017 in the Republican-dominated statehouse.  "It's important that that day be distinguished and separate and focused on the civil rights struggle and what he personally did in that effort," Hutchinson said. 
 Duda has called for an end to all confederate holidays throughout the South.

In March 2016,  the Pulaski County government endorsed an end to the dual holiday,  voting 13–0.  In December 2016, Duda successfully petitioned the City of Little Rock to take a stand on the REL/MLK Day issue and pass a resolution urging lawmakers to eliminate Lee Day as a holiday in favor of Martin Luther King Day.  The City Board of Directors voted 8 to 1 in favor of a King-only holiday. Duda continued his fight, reaching out to media and lawmakers in the next legislative session, and after a bi-partisan effort, Senate Bill 519 passed both houses  and was signed into law by Governor Asa Hutchinson on March 22, 2017. SB519 eliminated Lee Day as a state holiday, instead establishing a memorial day for Lee in October by gubernatorial proclamation and allowing King Day, the federal holiday to stand on its own. In an op-ed piece in the Jackson Clarion-Ledger, Duda called on Mississippi to do the same.

References

External links

 http://www.factor8movie.com Factor 8: The Arkansas Prison Blood Scandal website
 http://wm3ip.blogspot.com/
 http://wm3ip.blogspot.com/2008/01/attorney-fund-for-1993-slaying-suspects.html/
 https://web.archive.org/web/20090326071829/http://www.wm3injusticeproject.com/
 http://www.commercialappeal.com/news/2008/jan/17/money-at-root-of-effort-to-free-3/
 http://www.commercialappeal.com/news/2008/jan/25/freedom-fund-squabble-grows/
 http://westmemphisthreediscussion.yuku.com/topic/6191/t/Damien-s-Statement.html

American film directors
Living people
Wrongful conviction advocacy
1966 births